Orto-Balagan (Orto Balağan) is a rural locality (a selo), and one of two settlements, in addition to Kuranakh-Sala in, and the administrative centre of, Sordonnokhsky Rural Okrug of Oymyakonsky District in the Sakha Republic, Russia. Its population as of the 2002 Census was 341.

References

Notes

Sources
Official website of the Sakha Republic. Registry of the Administrative-Territorial Divisions of the Sakha Republic. Oymyakonsky District. 

Rural localities in Oymyakonsky District